Princess Charlotte of Württemberg (9 January 1807 – 2 February [O.S. 21 January] 1873), later known as Grand Duchess Elena Pavlovna, was the wife of Grand Duke Michael Pavlovich of Russia, the youngest son of Emperor Paul I of Russia and Duchess Sophie Dorothea of Württemberg.

Early life
She was born in Stuttgart, as Princess Charlotte of Württemberg, the eldest daughter of Prince Paul of Württemberg and of Princess Charlotte of Saxe-Hildburghausen. As a child, Charlotte lived in Paris with her father and her younger sister Pauline. Their home was quite modest by royal standards. In Paris, Charlotte came under the tutelage of several intellectuals.

Marriage and issue
In 1822, she became engaged to Grand Duke Mikhail Pavlovich of Russia, her first cousin once removed (Mikhail's mother was her father's aunt). It was said that Charlotte was an exceptional girl, highly intelligent and mature for her age of 15. The Grand Duke was obviously impressed by her beauty and her poise, and during a reception held in her honor, she charmed all the guests with her conversations. On 17 December 1823, she was received into the Russian Orthodox Church and was given the name Elena Pavlovna. On 20 February 1824, the couple married in Saint Petersburg and settled in the Mikhailovsky Palace. When the Dowager Empress Maria Feodorovna died in 1828, the palace of Pavlovsk passed on to Mikhail and he and Elena visited it often. Their marriage was not a happy one: Mikhail's only passion was for the army, and he neglected Elena. Nevertheless, he and Elena had five daughters, only two of whom lived to mature adulthood:
 Grand Duchess Maria Mikhailovna of Russia (9 March 1825, Moscow – 19 November 1846, Vienna); died unmarried.
 Grand Duchess Elizabeth Mikhailovna of Russia (26 May 1826, Moscow – 28 January 1845, Wiesbaden); married Adolf, Duke of Nassau and died in childbirth.
 Grand Duchess Catherine Mikhailovna of Russia (28 August 1827 – 12 May 1894), married Duke Georg August of Mecklenburg-Strelitz
 Grand Duchess Alexandra Mikhailovna of Russia (28 January 1831, Moscow – 27 March 1832, Moscow), died in childhood
 Grand Duchess Anna Mikhailovna of Russia (27 October 1834, Moscow – 22 March 1836, Saint Petersburg), died in childhood

Influence at court and in society 

Elena became a close friend of her brother-in-law, Emperor Alexander I of Russia and of his wife the Empress Elizabeth Alexeievna. She was also quick to befriend the shy Maria Alexandrovna, who married the then Tsarevich Alexander in 1841. When Princess Charlotte's husband died, in 1849, she became a patron of several charitable organizations and of the arts. She founded the Saint Petersburg Conservatoire and co-founded (1854) a group of nursing sisters which would eventually become the forerunners of the Red Cross in Russia. During her time in Russia she became known as the "family intellectual", and was considered the most exceptional woman in the imperial family since Catherine the Great. She founded the Russian Musical Society (1859) and the Russian Conservatoire (1862), and was liberal on serfdom. She helped to push her nephew Alexander II to abolish serfdom while he stayed with her.

As a patroness of the composer Anton Rubinstein (1829-1894), she commissioned some of his early operas: Fomka the Fool (1853), The Siberian Hunters (1852), and Vengeance (1852/1853).

Elena died in Saint Petersburg, at the age of 66.

Gallery

Ancestry

Bibliography
Lincoln, W. Bruce. The Romanovs: Autocrats of All the Russias. 1983
Sebag Montefiore, Simon. The Romanovs: 1613-1918. 2016. Knopf Publishing Group. 
Taylor, Philip S., Anton Rubinstein: A Life in Music, Indianapolis, 2007
Zeepvat, Charlotte. Romanov Autumn. 2001

References

External links

1807 births
1873 deaths
House of Württemberg
Princesses of Württemberg
House of Holstein-Gottorp-Romanov
Russian grand duchesses by marriage
Nobility from Stuttgart
Burials at Saints Peter and Paul Cathedral, Saint Petersburg